Leeville is a locality south of the town of Casino in northern New South Wales, Australia. In the 2016 Census, there were 247 people in Leeville.

Place name
Leeville is named after Charles Alfred Lee (1842-1927), M.L.A., Minister for Public Works in New South Wales from 1904-1910.

Transport
The Summerland Way and North Coast railway pass through, and a railway station was provided between 1905 and 1974.

References

Towns in New South Wales
Northern Rivers
Richmond Valley Council